The 1944 Dartmouth Indians football team represented Dartmouth College during the 1944 college football season.

Schedule

References

Dartmouth
Dartmouth Big Green football seasons
Dartmouth Indians football